Arsenal TV was a sports television channel devoted to coverage of the English football club Arsenal F.C. It was a part of the Setanta Sports package and was similar to other Setanta's other channels Celtic TV, Rangers TV and LFC TV.

Arsenal TV has been continued in the way of its successors being Arsenal's Web Player and Arsenal on YouTube.

History
Arsenal TV officially launched on 14 January 2008 on Sky Channel 423, however the channel was being tested on Sky for several days beforehand. Arsenal TV was available as a part of the Setanta Sports pack on Sky until 23 June 2009. The channel remained available to ex-Setanta Sports subscribers until it closed.

Arsenal TV joined Virgin Media on 18 March 2008 after a successful campaign by the club to get the channel on the service; it was available as part of the Setanta Sports package or TV Size XL.

The TV channel screened on Monday to Fridays: 4.30pm - 2am and Sunday: 6pm - 2am.

Timeshift Networks
Arsenal TV had two timeshift channels which broadcast on Sky from 1.30am to 7.45am. Both channels aired the same programming seen on the main channel on different days, although not at the same time. The slots were likely meant to have been used for Satanta to launch additional channels, so they were possibly under short-term one-year contracts.
 On 17 March 2008, Arsenal Replay was added to Sky Channel 424 (which later moved to 448). The channel was removed on 27 March 2009.
 On 12 May 2008, AH TV was added to Sky Channel 454. It was pretty much the same channel as above, except the fact it aired on different days. The channel was removed on 28 April 2009.

Closure
On 23 June 2009, Setanta Sports entered administration and ceased broadcasting its core channels. Arsenal announced that Arsenal TV would continue broadcasting in the short term but that the club would evaluate its long-term viability. On 22 July 2009, Setanta Sports administrators Deloitte announced that they would sell Setanta Sports' Sky Digital EPG slots through Canis Media, including Arsenal TV's slot on channel 435.

On 31 July 2009, Arsenal announced that due to Setanta Sports' administration and lack of resources to run a channel on their own, Arsenal TV would no longer be available on the Sky platform until further notice. Within this time, the club had explored alternative options regarding the future of Arsenal TV. However, for the short term, Arsenal TV was exclusively available online fully through the club's online channel, Arsenal Player and partly upon Arsenal on YouTube as well.  All of Arsenal's friendly matches prior to the 2009-10 season was shown exclusively on Arsenal TV Online apart from the Emirates Cup.

On 4 August, the channel space on Virgin Media was replaced with an on-screen slate citing that the channel had ceased broadcasting, with the channel eventually being removed from the service a week later.

On 6 August, after carrying a similar on-screen closure message during the channel's downtime since 4 August, the channel's broadcast space on Sky went blank. The following day on the 7th of August, the channel was removed from the Sky EPG.

Future
Arsenal TV has had its successors upon forms that differ from that of the aforementioned channel. 
This is the case as of Arsenal's Web Player and YouTube channels as a whole, where the content of these are exactly identical to that of Arsenal's TV.

Content
Arsenal both featured in prior upon Arsenal TV as well as of now on Arsenal Player and Arsenal on YouTube:
Replays of every Arsenal FC match in all competitions, including post match coverage and analysis
Exclusive interviews with staff and players
Live coverage of Arsenal Reserves and first-team friendly matches
Highlights of Arsenal Academy and Arsenal Ladies matches
Arsenal -related news
Highlights of classic matches
Documentaries based on the club's history

References

External links
 Official site

Arsenal F.C. mass media
Football club television channels in the United Kingdom
Television channels and stations established in 2008
Television channels and stations disestablished in 2009
Defunct television channels in the United Kingdom
2008 establishments in the United Kingdom
2009 disestablishments in the United Kingdom
Premier League on television